Miss USA World 1962 was the 1st edition of the Miss USA World pageant and it was held in the Huntington Field House in Huntington, West Virginia and was won by Amedee Chabot of California. She was crowned by outgoing titleholder, Jo Ann Odum of West Virginia. Chabot went on to represent the United States at the Miss World 1962 Pageant in London later that year. She finished in the Top 8 at Miss World.

Results

Placements

Special awards

Delegates
The Miss USA World 1962 delegates were:

 Alabama - Marilyn Nordman
 Alaska - Teresa Dawn Hanson
 Arkansas - Linda Suellyn Edwards
 California - Amedee Chabot
 Charleston, WV - Janice Lee Channels
 Chicago, IL - Marite Ozers
 Cleveland, OH - Andrea Jean Getzlaff
 Connecticut - Mary Lou Walkinshaw
 Delaware - Elaine LeGaro
 Detroit, MI - Janet Clift
 District of Columbia - Jo Ann Adelman
 East Liberty, Pittsburgh, PA - Donna Jean Paschka
 Florida - Lithona Rozier
 Georgia - Heidi Hambrick
 Huntington, WV - Sherry Lee Smith
 Illinois - Jo Peterson
 Indiana - June Cochran
 Kansas - Penny Rae Nichols
 Kentucky - Sally Margaret Carter
 Los Angeles, CA - Linda Pauline Kennon
 Louisiana - Diane Gay DeClouet
 Maine - Jodie Malizia
 Maryland - Betsy Reeves
 Massachusetts - Mary Marble
 Michigan - Carla Rodgers
 Missouri - Bonnie Elizabeth Barclay
 New Jersey - Vivian Lynn Volk
 New Mexico - Elva Lynne Palmer
 New York - Pat Franklin
 New York City, NY - Mimi Miller
 North Carolina Louise Furr
 Ohio - Glyn Warstler
 Oregon - Jodie Ray
 Pennsylvania - Maria Fraietta
 Pittsburgh, PA - Beverly Wolfe
 South Carolina - Nancy Ann Harrison
 Tennessee - Rita Wilson
 Texas - Shirley Dickson
 Utah - Dyane Miner
 Virginia - Laurie Mills
 Washington - Patricia Dzejachok
 West Virginia - Carole E. Johnson

Notes

Withdrawals
 - Julie Jones was named as Miss Hawaii World 1962 and had competed at the pageant; however withdrew during finals due to back pains after the evening gown competition.

Did not Compete

 - Julie Jones (see Hawaii under withdrawals)

Crossovers
Contestants who competed in other beauty pageants:

Miss USA
1960: : June Cochran
1962: : Teresa Dawn Hanson
1962: : Sally Margaret Carter
1962: : Diane Gay DeClouet
1963:  Chicago, IL - Marite Ozers (Winner; as )

Miss America
1962: : Carole E. Johnson

References

External links
Miss World Official Website
Miss World America Official Website

World America
1962
1962 in West Virginia